Luigi Carpaneda (28 November 1925 – 14 December 2011) was an Italian fencer and sailor. He competed at the 1956 and 1960 Olympics and won a gold and a silver medal, respectively, in the team foil event. Besides fencing, Carpaneda was a five-time sailing captain of the Italian team at the Admiral Cup and won an international race in the 3/4 ton class in 1982 on Botta Dritta. He was killed by a car driving on red light in Milan.

References

1925 births
2011 deaths
Italian male fencers
Olympic fencers of Italy
Fencers at the 1956 Summer Olympics
Fencers at the 1960 Summer Olympics
Olympic gold medalists for Italy
Olympic silver medalists for Italy
Olympic medalists in fencing
Fencers from Milan
Medalists at the 1956 Summer Olympics
Medalists at the 1960 Summer Olympics